Ameroseiella is a genus of mites in the family Ameroseiidae. There are at least three described species in Ameroseiella.

Species
These three species belong to the genus Ameroseiella:
 Ameroseiella apodius (Karg, 1971)
 Ameroseiella macrochelae Westerboer, 1963
 Ameroseiella stepposa Bregetova, 1977

References

External links

 

Ameroseiidae